Deshnie Govender (born 5 April 1985), better known as DJ Roxxi, is a South African DJ and influencer, who is one of a few Indian female club DJs in South Africa.

Early life and education
Roxxi was born in Isipingo, Durban, South Africa, and raised in Amanzimtoti. She is the daughter of Ruth Govender and Vassie Mottai Govender. She has a younger sister named Michelle Govender. Roxxi attended Holy Family College for a short while and thereafter Isipingo Primary School. She completed high school at Kingsway High School in Amanzimtoti. In 2002 Roxxi's father died from a heart attack.

Although Roxxi first planned to embark on a music career straight after high school, she ultimately chose to attend secondary education first, as it was frowned upon in the Indian community for a young girl to become a club DJ. Roxxi enrolled in Natal University to study towards an LL.B. (law) Degree, studying journalism in her second year. Towards the end of 2003, Roxxi dropped out of her course. During this break she discovered her musical talents while working part-time at her mother's nightclub in Amanzimtoti.

Career

Music career

2005–2008 
Roxxi was exposed to the music styles of various DJs at her mother's club. She taught herself how to play by researching and watching other DJs perform. From 2005 to 2006 Roxxi played at many low-key promotions at her mother's club gaining confidence and skills through each event. Heralded as the first Indian female club DJ in South Africa, Roxxi was soon asked to appear at many events and shows.

Debut single 
In 2009, DJ Roxxi decided to embark on a new venture. She teamed up with a longtime friend and fellow artist Nic Billington and penned a track entitled "Away". The track features Nic Billington on vocals and was produced by Craig Massiv of Flash Republic fame.

The track, which was offered as a free download to fans, reached number one on the top 9 at 9 on East Coast Radio on 4 December 2009, making Roxxi the first female DJ in South Africa to have a number 1 single.

Influencer 
In 2020 Govender released a podcast, Influence Insider, which was produced by Digi Hype.

Marketing 
Govender has worked as a Brand Manager for Johnnie Walker.

Personal life 
Govender is a fan of Bollywood films and music. As of 2012, she was based in Johannesburg.

Awards
Roxxi was nominated as one of Cosmopolitan Magazines Top 30 Awesome Women of 2006. Roxxi was also selected as a rising star in the Standard Bank Salutes Women of KZN Awards in 2008.

In November 2012 Roxxi participated in the Global Spin Awards 2012 in New York City, where she won Best DJ in the Africa category.

In 2019, a book Govender co-authored with David Bird, Tastes of Durban, tied for third place in the Local (World) category at the 24th annual Gourmand World Cookbook Awards.

External links 

 Official Website
 Official YouTube

References

1985 births
Living people
21st-century South African musicians
21st-century South African women
21st-century women musicians
Electronic dance music DJs
People from Durban
People from Johannesburg
South African DJs
Women DJs